Favartia iredalei is a species of sea snail, a marine gastropod mollusk in the family Muricidae, the murex snails or rock snails, first described by Winston Ponder in 1972. The species epithet, iredalei, honours Tom Iredale.

References

Muricidae
Gastropods described in 1972
Taxa named by Winston Ponder